The 1956–57 Plunket Shield season was a tournament of the Plunket Shield, the domestic first-class cricket competition of New Zealand. It was the first season featuring the Northern Districts team.

Wellington won the championship, finishing at the top of the points table at the end of the round-robin tournament between the six first-class sides, Auckland, Canterbury, Central Districts, Northern Districts, Otago and Wellington. Eight points were awarded for a win, four points for having a first innings lead in a draw and two points for a first innings deficit in a draw.

Table
Below are the Plunket Shield standings for the season:

References

Plunket Shield
Plunket Shield